Steven Lustica (born 12 April 1991) is an Australian soccer player who plays for Western United.

He is of Croat heritage, his relative Slavko Luštica was a footballer at Hajduk Split.

Club career

Gold Coast
On 24 April 2009, it was confirmed that Lustica had been signed by Gold Coast United, after impressing United's assistant coach, Paul Okon, during his tenure as under-18s coach at the Australian Olympic Youth Festival.

On 19 September 2009, he made his senior debut for Gold Coast, coming off the bench in the 88th minute against Central Coast Mariners.

Hajduk Split
On 8 June 2011, it was announced that Lustica signed a four-year contract with Croatian giant Hajduk Split. He made his debut against F.C. Barcelona on 23 July 2011. He made his Prva HNL debut on 13 August 2011 against NK Istra in a 3–0 away win with Lustica getting an assist. On 5 June 2011, Lustica scored his first goal for HNK Hajduk Split in a man of the match performance against NK Varazdin also getting an assist in the game.

Dugopolje (loan)
On 25 January 2012 it was announced that Lustica would join Croatian 2. HNL side NK Dugopolje for the second half of the 2011–12 season. Lustica made 10 appearances for Dugopolje, scoring one goal and assisting the club in achieving promotion to Prva HNL as they beat NK Pomorac Kostrena to the 2. HNL Championship by one point. Lustica returned to Hajduk Split at the conclusion of Dugopolje's season.

Brisbane Roar (loan)
On 26 January 2013, Brisbane Roar in the Australian A-League signed Lustica on a loan deal which would see him stay at the club until the end of the 2012–13 A-League season. Prior to his signing, Brisbane were having a disappointing season, losing 10 of their opening 17 games of the season and picking up just 17 points. Reunited with former coach Mike Mulvey, Lustica would help turn around Brisbane's season. The club lost only two league games in the remaining 10 games of the regular season, qualifying for the post-season Finals, a feat which looked unlikely after the first two-thirds of the season. Despite the Roar being interested in retaining Lustica, Hajduk Split refused to release him and he returned to Hajduk in June 2013. Luštica scored two goals in his 12 appearances on loan with Brisbane.

Adelaide United
In September 2013, Hajduk Split changed their mind about releasing him and Lustica was granted a release from his contract which allowed him to return to the A-League with Adelaide United where he agreed a one-year contract for the 2013–14 season. Lustica impressed in his appearances for United, earning himself a place in the Team of the Week in Round 13.

Departure from Adelaide United
Lustica's time at Adelaide was to be short-lived however, when on 29 January 2014 he requested an early termination to his contract in order to make himself available to former club Brisbane Roar. As Lustica entered the final six months of his contract, he was in negotiations with Adelaide over a one-year extension. According to Adelaide, an agreement was reached in principal but not formalised. Around the same time, Brisbane approached him and an enquiry was made as to whether Adelaide would consider releasing him to join the club immediately, which Adelaide refused. Following this, Adelaide head coach Josep Gombau reported that Lustica had failed to attend training and declared that Lustica was no longer welcome at the club. Lustica was subsequently released from contract with Adelaide United on 2 February 2014.

Return to Brisbane Roar
On 4 February 2014, it was announced that Lustica had re-signed with former club, Brisbane Roar until the end of the 2015–16 season. Lustica scored his first return goal for Brisbane Roar against the Newcastle Jets in a Round 6 clash which ended in a 4–0 victory for Roar, courtesy of an Henrique hattrick. He scored another goal in the 5–4 battering of Roar against Sydney FC. He rounded off his fairly prolific goalscoring season with a hattrick in a 6–1 win against the Central Coast Mariners at Suncorp Stadium, also providing an assist for Brandon Borrello. The first season of his second spell at the club, Lustica made 25 appearances, scoring five goals and notching two assists.

Lustica opened his goal tally for the 2015–16 season netting a composed finish against the Wellington Phoenix, a 2–1 win to the Roar, as they braved hot conditions in Cairns. Brisbane Roar tabled Lustica a new contract offer in December 2015.

Western Sydney Wanderers
On 23 May 2016, Lustica signed with the Western Sydney Wanderers on a 2-year contract. The versatile midfielder will forever be etched in Wanderers history for his goal against English Premier League giants Arsenal in July 2017. On 30 June 2018, after making 35 appearances in all competitions, Lustica departed from Western Sydney Wanderers to pursue offers in Europe.

Inter Zaprešić
In July 2018, shortly after leaving Western Sydney Wanderers, Lustica joined Croatian club Inter Zaprešić. Romanian top-tier team F.C Botosani offered Lustica a contract that he declined.

Career statistics

Honours

Club
Sydney FC Youth
National Youth League Championship: 2008–09
National Youth League Premiership: 2008–09

Gold Coast Youth
National Youth League Championship: 2009–10, 2010–11
National Youth League Premiership: 2010–11

Dugopolje
 Croatian Second Football League: 2011–12

Brisbane Roar
 A-League Championship: 2013–14
 A-League Premiership: 2013–14

Western United
 A-League Men Championship: 2021–22

International
Australia U-19
 AFF U-19 Youth Championship: 2010

Individual
National Youth League Player of the Season: 2010–11

References

External links

1991 births
Living people
Australian soccer players
Australian people of Croatian descent
Gold Coast United FC players
HNK Hajduk Split players
NK Dugopolje players
NK Inter Zaprešić players
A-League Men players
Croatian Football League players
First Football League (Croatia) players
Uzbekistan Super League players
Brisbane Roar FC players
Adelaide United FC players
Western Sydney Wanderers FC players
FC Qizilqum Zarafshon players
Western United FC players
Association football midfielders
Australian expatriate soccer players
Expatriate footballers in Croatia
Expatriate footballers in Uzbekistan
Sportspeople from Canberra
Soccer players from the Australian Capital Territory
Australia under-20 international soccer players
Australian expatriate sportspeople in Croatia
Australian expatriate sportspeople in Uzbekistan